Norvegia (Latin for Norway) is a phonetic transcription system which was developed by Norwegian linguist Johan Storm in 1884. Norvegia is still employed in the teaching of Scandinavian studies at Norwegian universities.

Further reading
 Sigurd Kolsrud (1950): Norsk ljodskrift
 Johan Storm (1884): Norsk Lydskrift med Omrids av Fonetiken. Norvegia I, s. 19–132 
 Johan Storm (1908): Norsk Lydskrift med Omrids av Fonetiken: Andet Afsnit. Norvegia I. s. 133–179

See also
 Dania transcription
 Kjell (letter)

External links
 Lydskrift. Brief overview by Patrik Bye of the University of Tromsø.

Norwegian language
Phonetic guides
Phonetic alphabets